Bareilly–Pilibheet Provincial State Railway was owned by the Provincial Government and worked by the Rohilkund and Kumaon Railway.

History  
Two metre gauge sections were built to form the Bareilly–Pilibheet Provincial State Railway; Bhojeepura to Bareilly (12 miles) opened 1 October 1884, and Pilibheet to Bhojeepura (24 miles) opened 15 November 1884. It merged with the Lucknow–Sitapur–Seramow Provincial State Railway to become the Lucknow–Bareilly Railway on 1 January 1891.

Conversion to broad gauge 

The railway lines were converted to  broad gauge in 2017.

Notes 
 Rao, M.A. (1988). Indian Railways, New Delhi: National Book Trust
 Chapter 1 - Evolution of Indian Railways-Historical Background

Indian companies established in 1884
1891 disestablishments in India
Railway companies established in 1884
Railway companies disestablished in 1891
1891 mergers and acquisitions
Metre gauge railways in India
Defunct railway companies of India
History of rail transport in Uttar Pradesh
Transport in Bareilly